São Brás (Portuguese for Saint Blaise) is a parish in the district of Ribeira Grande in the Azores. The population in 2011 was 650, in an area of 8.08 km².

References

Parishes of Ribeira Grande, Azores